The Hungarian Research Centre for Linguistics was created in 1949. It was under the supervision of the Hungarian Academy of Sciences from 1951 until 2019, when it was moved by a governmental decree to the supervision of Eötvös Loránd Research Network, a decision contested by the Hungarian Academy of Sciences.

Its primary tasks include research in Hungarian linguistics, general, theoretical and applied linguistics, Uralic linguistics, and phonetics, as well as the preparation of a comprehensive dictionary of the Hungarian language, and the maintenance of its archive materials. Other research projects investigate various aspects and different variants of Hungarian. Further tasks include the assembly of linguistic corpora and databases, and laying the linguistic groundwork for computational software and applications. The Institute also operates a public advice service on language and linguistics, prepares expert reports on relevant affairs on demand, and runs the Theoretical Linguistics Undergraduate and Doctoral Program jointly with Eötvös Loránd University.

References

External links
  (English version)

Hungarian language
Research institutes in Hungary
Linguistic research institutes
Language regulators